The 2009–10 Liga I was the ninety-second season of Liga I, the top-level football league of Romania. Unirea Urziceni were the defending champions.

Teams 
Farul Constanța, Otopeni and Gloria Buzău were relegated at the end of the 2008–09 season. They were joined by Argeș Pitești, who were demoted upon a decision of the Professional Football League on 8 July 2009, after their owner, Cornel Penescu, was found guilty of corruption. As a consequence, 15th-placed Gaz Metan Mediaș were spared relegation.

The four relegated teams were replaced by the champions and runners-up from both 2008–09 Liga II divisions. Ceahlăul Piatra Neamț and Ploiești were promoted from Seria I while Unirea Alba Iulia and Internațional Curtea de Argeș were promoted from Seria II.

Promoted team FC Ploiești were renamed FC Astra Ploiești, effective to 1 July 2009.

Venues

Personnel and kits

Managerial changes

League table

Positions by round

Results

Top goalscorers

Source: RomanianSoccer

Champion squad

Season statistics

Scoring
 Hattricks scored: 4
Florin Costea for Craiova against Unirea, minutes 15, 31 and 79 (Round 9 – 3 October 2009)
Gheorghe Bucur for Timișoara against Gaz Metan, minutes 45, 72 and 85 (Round 15 – 29 November 2009)
Wesley Lopes da Silva for Vaslui against Unirea, minutes 47, 61 and 90 (Round 25 – 3 April 2010)
Cristian Bud for CFR against Unirea (Round 29 – 24 April 2009)

References

Liga I seasons
Romania
1